Trabea is a genus of wolf spiders first described by Eugène Simon in 1876.

Species
 it contains thirteen species:
Trabea bipunctata (Roewer, 1959) — Congo, Rwanda, Malawi, Ethiopia
Trabea cazorla Snazell, 1983 — Spain, Morocco, Algeria
Trabea heteroculata Strand, 1913 — Rwanda, Tanzania, Kenya
Trabea natalensis Russell-Smith, 1982 — South Africa
Trabea nigriceps Purcell, 1903 — South Africa
Trabea nigristernis Alderweireldt, 1999 — Malawi
Trabea ornatipalpis Russell-Smith, 1982 — South Africa
Trabea paradoxa Simon, 1876 — Southern Europe, Turkey
Trabea purcelli Roewer, 1951 — South Africa
Trabea rubriceps Lawrence, 1952 — South Africa
Trabea setula Alderweireldt, 1999 — Malawi
Trabea unicolor Purcell, 1903 — South Africa
Trabea varia Purcell, 1903 — South Africa

References

External links

Araneomorphae genera
Lycosidae